Basic Education High School No. 1 Meiktila (commonly known as Royal No.1 High School), located on the bank of Lake Meiktila, is a public high school in Meiktila, Myanmar.

High schools in Mandalay Region
Meiktila
Educational institutions established in 1901
1901 establishments in Burma